The 1810 New York gubernatorial election was held in April 1810 to elect the Governor and Lieutenant Governor of New York.

Candidates
The Democratic-Republican Party nominated incumbent Daniel D. Tompkins. They nominated incumbent John Broome for Lieutenant Governor.

The Federalist Party nominated state senator Jonas Platt. They nominated former Adjutant General of New York Nicholas Fish for Lieutenant Governor.

Results
The Democratic-Republican ticket of Tompkins and Broome was elected. Broome would die 4 months later, necessitating a special election.

Sources
Result: The Tribune Almanac 1841

See also
New York gubernatorial elections
New York state elections

1810
Gubernatorial
New York
April 1810 events